James McCartan may refer to:

James McCartan Snr (1938–2021), Irish Gaelic footballer
James McCartan Jnr, Irish Gaelic footballer, son of James McCartan Snr

See also
James McCarten, English football (soccer) player